Veronika Shulga (born April 24, 1981) is a Ukrainian football goalkeeper, currently playing in the Ukrainian Women's League for Zhytlobud-1 Kharkiv. Having started her career in the Ukrainian Championship's Lehenda Chernihiv, from 1999 she developed it mostly in Russia, also playing for Energiya Voronezh, Lada Togliatti, CSK VVS Samara, Nadezhda Noginsk and Ryazan VDV, with which she won the 2000 title.

She has been a member of the Ukrainian national team.

References

1981 births
Living people
Ukrainian women's footballers
WFC Lehenda-ShVSM Chernihiv players
WFC Zhytlobud-1 Kharkiv players
Expatriate women's footballers in Russia
Ukrainian expatriate sportspeople in Russia
Ryazan-VDV players
Women's association football goalkeepers
CSP Izmailovo players
FC Lada Togliatti (women) players
FC Energy Voronezh players
CSK VVS Samara (women's football club) players